Thomas Bloomer (14 July 18945 January 1984) was born on 14 July 1894 and educated at the Royal School Dungannon and Trinity College, Dublin. He began his ministry as a curate at Carrickfergus. Later he was Vicar of St Mark’s, Bath and then Rural Dean of Barking before his ordination to the episcopate as Bishop of Carlisle. He was consecrated a bishop on St Luke's day 1946 (18 October), by Cyril Garbett, Archbishop of York, at York Minster — his brother, James Bloomer, then-Rector of Armagh, preached. He retired as bishop in 1966, and died on 5 January 1984.

References

1894 births
People educated at the Royal School Dungannon
Alumni of Trinity College Dublin
Anglicans from Northern Ireland
Bishops of Carlisle
20th-century Church of England bishops
1984 deaths